2005 J.League Cup Final was the 13th final of the J.League Cup competition. The final was played at National Stadium in Tokyo on 5 November 2005. JEF United Chiba won the championship.

Match details

See also
2005 J.League Cup

References

J.League Cup
2005 in Japanese football
JEF United Chiba matches
Gamba Osaka matches
J.League Cup Final 2005